United Nations Security Council Resolution 2007, unanimously adopted on September 14, 2011, after recalling resolution 1786 (2007) on the International Criminal Tribunal for the former Yugoslavia (ICTY), the Council reappointed Serge Brammertz as prosecutor of the Tribunal, countermanding the Tribunal's statute.

See also 
List of United Nations Security Council Resolutions 2001 to 2100

References

External links
Text of the Resolution at undocs.org

 2007
September 2011 events
United Nations Security Council resolutions concerning the International Criminal Tribunal for the former Yugoslavia